Titus B. Welliver is an American actor. He is best known for his portrayals of the Man in Black in Lost, Silas Adams in Deadwood, Jimmy O’Phelan in Sons of Anarchy, and the title role in the television series Bosch and Bosch: Legacy. He is also known for his collaborations with Ben Affleck, starring in his films Gone Baby Gone (2007) and The Town (2010).

Early life
Welliver was born in New Haven, Connecticut. His father, Neil Welliver, was a well-known American landscape painter who was a professor of fine art at Yale University before becoming dean of the University of Pennsylvania's Graduate School of Fine Art. Welliver's mother, Norma Cripps, was a fashion illustrator. Welliver studied drama at New York University in the early 1980s before his film and television career began. Welliver befriended Adam Sandler in a comedy writing class while attending New York University.

Welliver's life has been marked by losses. His younger sister, Ashley Welliver, died of sudden infant death syndrome as an infant in the spring of 1976, and his 38-year old stepmother, Polly Mudge Welliver, died of a strep infection six months later on October 29. His 21-year old younger brother, Eli Lustman Welliver, was killed in mid-May 1991 by an overdose when his drink was spiked with heroin during an attempted robbery at a bar near Payap University in Chiang Mai, Thailand. His 45-year old elder brother, Silas Bartley Welliver, died of muscular dystrophy on February 16, 2002, and his fourth wife, the film producer Elizabeth W. Alexander, died of breast cancer on October 23, 2012.

Career

Film
Welliver has worked on several film projects, including The Doors (1991), Mobsters (1991), Mulholland Falls (1996), Rough Riders (1997), Once in the Life (2000), Biker Boyz (2003), Twisted (2004), Assault on Precinct 13 (2005). He has been cast in all four of director Ben Affleck's films to date; Gone Baby Gone (2007), The Town (2010), Argo (2012) and Live by Night (2016). He was also cast in director Michael Bay's film Transformers: Age of Extinction in 2014.

Television
On television, he had a recurring role as a doctor on NYPD Blue and was one of the stars of the CBS police drama Brooklyn South.  Moreover, Welliver is well known for playing the semi-regular character Silas Adams on the HBO series Deadwood. Welliver played "The Representative" in two episodes of Prison Break, portrayed Kyle Hollis (a.k.a. Reverend Orson Parker) in the NBC series Life, and appeared in the season five finale of Lost as the "Man in Black", which he continued to portray during the sixth and final season. In 1999 he appeared in an episode of Touched by an Angel titled "The Occupant", where he played a man who was "occupied" by a demon. In 2002 Welliver played Tom Landricks, a rapist, on Law & Order: Special Victims Unit.

He was introduced into FX's Sons of Anarchy midway through season two, in which he portrays Irish gun kingpin Jimmy O'Phelan.  In 2009, he started playing the role of Prosecutor Glenn Childs, a rival of Chris Noth's character, in the CBS series The Good Wife. He joined the cast of the apocalyptic drama The Last Ship in a recurring role for its first two seasons, as Thorwald, a local warlord fighting underground in a dying world infected by a global pandemic.

Welliver plays the title role in the TV series Bosch from Amazon Studios. The series is based on the novels centered on the character of the same name by Michael Connelly. The first season of the series was released on Amazon Prime Video on February 13, 2015.  The series was renewed for a seventh and final season on February 13, 2020. The Bosch series was followed by a May 2022 spin off entitled Bosch: Legacy in which Bosch plays a private detective and his daughter, Madeline, (played by Madison Lintz) is a rookie police officer, still set in Los Angeles. Welliver had a cameo appearance as an Imperial captain in the Disney+ series The Mandalorian.

Audiobooks
Welliver is also the narrator of several audiobooks, including Robert B. Parker's series of American western novels, Appaloosa, Brimstone, Blue-Eyed Devil and Ironhorse. He has also narrated several of the Michael Connelly Bosch series of crime fiction novels, including The Crossing, The Burning Room and The Wrong Side of Goodbye.

Personal life
Welliver has been married five times. His marriages to Heather Wielandt, Hollywood talent agent Dani Sexton, and actress Joanna Heimbold ended in divorce. He was widowed when his fourth wife, film producer Elizabeth W. Alexander, died of breast cancer in 2012. He has a daughter with Alexander, and two sons with Heimbold. All three of his children, Cora, Quinn and Eamonn have appeared in Welliver's two series. He married Jose Stemkens, a Dutch fashion consultant and former model, in 2014. Welliver filed for divorce from Stemkens in May 2019.  As of May 2022, Welliver is engaged to Samantha Edge.

Filmography

Film

Television

References

External links

Living people
20th-century American male actors
21st-century American male actors
American male film actors
American male television actors
American male voice actors
Tisch School of the Arts alumni
Male actors from New Haven, Connecticut
Year of birth missing (living people)